LisaRaye McCoy (born September 23, 1967), known as LisaRaye, is an American actress, fashion designer, model, businesswoman and former first lady of the Turks and Caicos Islands. McCoy is best known for portraying Diana "Diamond" Armstrong in the 1998 film The Players Club, Neesee James on the UPN/The CW sitcom All of Us from 2003 until 2007 and Keisha Greene in the VH1 romantic comedy series Single Ladies which originally aired from 2011 to 2015. She was also married to Michael Misick, the first Premier of the Turks and Caicos Islands, from 2006 until 2010; during that time she served as First Lady of Turks and Caicos.

Biography

Early life
McCoy was born in Chicago, Illinois. McCoy is the daughter of David Ray McCoy, a Chicago businessman, and Katie McCoy, a former professional model. Her paternal half-sister is Da Brat. Growing up on the south side of Chicago, McCoy attended St. James College Prep, Kenwood Academy and later Thornridge High School; graduating in 1986. After high school, McCoy attended Eastern Illinois University before pursuing an acting career.

Career
McCoy made her acting debut as the lead in Reasons, an independent film directed by Monty Ross. McCoy is perhaps best known for her role as Diamond in The Players Club, directed and written by Ice Cube. She also appeared in The Wood, opposite Taye Diggs, Rhapsody, All About You, and Go for Broke. In 2003, McCoy starred as Neesee James in the UPN/ The CW sitcom All of Us, where she played Duane Martin's ex-wife. The series ended in 2007. McCoy began her career as a model for fashion, but before that she was married to Archie Amerson. She did shows in churches and high schools in her native Chicago. In addition to acting, McCoy has also appeared in dozens of music videos, including "Know Filter 2" by Shleah, Tugoa, T.Lee, "Download" by Lil' Kim, Changing Faces's "Same Tempo", Ginuwine's "Last Chance", Ludacris' "Number 1 Spot", Calvin Richardson's "True Love," Sisqó's "Incomplete", Lil Jon and Ice Cube's "Roll Call",   "I Don't Wanna See" and " I Really Want to Sex Your Body," by Link, Tupac Shakur's "Toss It Up", "Never Be The Same Again" by Ghostface Killah & Carl Thomas, ""Unpredictable" by Jamie Foxx, Ooohhhwwweee" by Master P, "Slip N' Slide by Danny Boy, and "Are You in the Mood" by Teddy & Dru Down. She also had a cameo in Seven's music video "Girls" & Jaheim's music video "Back Tight Wit You" McCoy also recorded the single "Would You?" with rapper Benzino. In 2005, McCoy launched two fashion lines: Luxe & Romance, a lingerie line that was introduced during New York's Fashion Week, and Xraye, a jeans line for women. In 2011, she launched her jean collection "The LisaRaye Collection" in partnership with PZI Jeans, and a hair line, "LisaRaye Glamour." That same year, she was the Ambassador/Grand Marshal for the 70th Magic City Classic parade and football game in Birmingham, Alabama.

The actress has an upcoming movie "You Married Dat" release date to be announced. The movie stars Juhahn Jones, Michael Colyar, Trisha Mann, Apryl Jones, Trisha Mann, and Audra Kinkead.

Personal life
McCoy has a daughter named Kai Morae Pace (born December 5, 1989) with Kenji Pace. In 1992, McCoy married Tony Martin. They divorced in 1994. In April 2006, McCoy married Michael Misick, who had been elected the Premier of the Turks and Caicos Islands in a position previously known as Chief Minister of the Turks and Caicos Islands in 2003. They were married in a lavish ceremony before 300 guests, followed by a three-week honeymoon to Jerusalem, Bali and Dubai. During their marriage, McCoy's title was "First Lady of Turks and Caicos." In August 2008, Premier Misick released a statement announcing that he and McCoy were divorcing. Misick resigned from office in March 2009 after an investigation found "clear signs of corruption" involving selling off public land to fund his own investments. He fled Turks and Caicos, and was eventually arrested in Brazil and extradited back to the islands to stand trial.

McCoy is a convert to Christianity.

"Queen Mother of Ghana" claims
McCoy has incorrectly referred to herself as "Queen Mother of Ghana" on multiple occasions, including a 2019 appearance on The Wendy Williams Show. Her claims and the uncritical reporting of American media outlets were widely mocked on Ghanaian social media, with journalist Nana Aba Anamoah accusing her of "ignorance" and noting that the title does not exist as Ghana is a republic not a monarchy. McCoy was crowned "queen mother" during a ceremony at a Los Angeles nightclub in September 2019. She was given the title by Yahweh ben Yahweh ben Yahweh, a self-proclaimed "imperial king" and former member of a hip hop group from Orange County, Florida. McCoy stated that "To have such an honor bestowed upon me by my own African people [sic] is a testament to my hard work and character". Yahweh, who refers to himself as "The Imperial Majesty King Yahweh The Holy Ghost", had in turn purchased the title of nkosuohene from a chief of the small town of Kwanyako in Ghana's Central Region. Granting of such honorary titles to foreigners is a common practice in Ghana.

McCoy visited Kwanyako herself in July 2021, promising to finance a vocational centre for women and a local performance troupe.

Filmography

Film and TV Movies

Television

Music Videos

Award nominations

See also
Hip hop models

References

External links
 

1967 births
Actresses from Chicago
African-American actresses
African-American fashion designers
American fashion designers
American women fashion designers
American film actresses
American television actresses
Eastern Illinois University alumni
Living people
Spouses of national leaders
20th-century American actresses
21st-century American actresses
20th-century African-American women
20th-century African-American people
21st-century African-American women
21st-century African-American people